Santo Stino di Livenza is a railway station serving the town of Santo Stino di Livenza, in the region of Veneto, northern Italy. The station opened on 17 June 1886 and is located on the Venice–Trieste railway. The train services are operated by Trenitalia.

Train services
The station is served by the following service(s):

Express services (Regionale Veloce) Venice - Portogruaro - Cervignano del Friuli - Trieste
Express services ( Regionale Veloce ) Verona - Padua - Venice - Latisana
Local services (Treno regionale) Venice - Portogruaro

See also

History of rail transport in Italy
List of railway stations in Veneto
Rail transport in Italy
Railway stations in Italy

References

 This article is based upon a translation of the Italian language version as of January 2016.

External links

Railway stations in Veneto